Ronald Norman Paez (10 November 1931 – 17 August 2014) was an Australian rules football player.

Playing career
Paez made his debut for South Melbourne in Round 9 of the 1949 VFL season. By the end of 1949 he had played seven games. He played a total of 52 matches, scoring 51 goals. His last match was against Fitzroy in 1953.  He then moved to Shepparton where he captained and coached the Shepparton Football Club in the Goulburn Valley Football League, including coaching them to the 1957 premiership.

References

External links
 

Sydney Swans players
Australian rules footballers from Victoria (Australia)
1931 births
2014 deaths
Shepparton Football Club players